is a private university in Ebetsu, Hokkaido, Japan. The predecessor of the school was founded in 1939 under the name Hokkaido Women's College. It was chartered as a junior women's college in 1963. It became a four-year college in 1997. The present name was adopted in 2007.

External links
 Official website 

Educational institutions established in 1933
Private universities and colleges in Japan
Universities and colleges in Hokkaido
1933 establishments in Japan